Madhupur may refer to several places:

Bangladesh
 Madhupur, Bangladesh, a town in Tangail District
 Madhupur Upazila, Tangail District

India
 Madhupur, Deoghar, Jharkhand
 Madhupur Junction, Deoghar, Jharkhand
 Madhupur Junction railway station
 Madhupur (community development block), Jharkhand
 Madhupur (Vidhan Sabha constituency), Jharkhand
 Madhupur, Diglipur, Andman & Nicobar Islands
 Madhupur, Sonbhadra, Uttar Pradesh
 Madhupur, Chanditala-I, Hooghly district, West Bengal

See also 
Madhopur (disambiguation)